Independence is a census-designated place and unincorporated community in Tate County, Mississippi, United States.

Although an unincorporated community, Independence has a zip code of 38638.

It was first named as a CDP in the 2020 Census which listed a population of 200.

History
The settlement was first known as "Flewellenes Crossroads" and "Buck Snorts".

During the Civil War, R.W. Locke organized a company of soldiers in Buck Snorts, which was dispatched to Virginia where they became Company D of the 42d Mississippi Infantry Regiment.  Locke was elected company captain.

The population in 1900 was 100.

By 1907, Independence had a post office, several stores/businesses, two churches, and a public school.

Demographics

2020 census

Note: the US Census treats Hispanic/Latino as an ethnic category. This table excludes Latinos from the racial categories and assigns them to a separate category. Hispanics/Latinos can be of any race.

Notable people
 Hugh Freeze, former head coach of the Ole Miss Rebels football team at the Ole Miss.
 Michael Conner Humphreys, actor who played Young Forrest Gump in Forrest Gump
 R.L. Burnside, blues musician.

References

Unincorporated communities in Tate County, Mississippi
Unincorporated communities in Mississippi
Census-designated places in Tate County, Mississippi
Memphis metropolitan area